Catherine Belkhodja (born 15 April 1955) is a French artist, actress and film director.

Early life 
On 15 April 1955, Belkhodja was born in Paris, France, to an Algerian father and a French mother.

She lived and studied in Algiers where she wrote her first short stories. She went on studying theatre, music and fine arts, took her first steps in the cinema and left for Paris to read architecture, philosophy, town planning and ethnology of the Maghreb.

She graduated in philosophy and began earning her living as a teacher, then reading architecture, specialising in bioclimatics and working in the town planning department of the Paris Prefecture. She later took aesthetics with Olivier Revault d'Allones at the Sorbonne University, prior to leaving for Belgium to further her studies in solar architecture, then for Egypt to work with Hassan Fathy on earth architecture.

Career 
Belkhodja's activities range from the cinema and television to conceptual art, as well as journalism, philosophy and writing.

Cinema 
On her return to Paris from Egypt, she enrolled at the Paris Academy of Dramatic Art and took her first steps in the cinema under Claire Devers in "Noir et Blanc" (Black and White), Guy Gilles in "Nuit docile" (Docile night), Jean-Pierre Limosin in "L'autre nuit" (The other night) and Benoît Peeters in "Le compte-rendu" (The Report). She was the central character in Chris Marker's Silent Movie and documentary Level Five.

Television 
Belkhodja has collaborated on a number of television programmes, such as Moi-je, Sexy folies, Mosaïque, Envoyé spécial, Des racines et des ailes, Faut pas rêver, Océaniques.

While working on a television programme, she was noticed by Philippe Alfonsi, who asked her to present a new magazine he was setting up with Maurice Dugowson and invited her to help in its conception. Thus came to life Taxi, a talk show in which Belkhodja and her guests would sit in a Cadillac driven by night around Paris. The programme was awarded a Sept d'or by the French television profession.

Following the success of this programme, Chris Marker gave her the role of a journalist in Level Five (1997). She then left for Algeria to make her first documentary "Reflet perdu du miroir", the story of twin sisters who meet after a long separation.

Writing 
Belkhodja published her first newspaper articles in Le Sauvage and Sans frontières and wrote her first script on her return from Egypt. She has worked as a reporter for the Gamma Agency, has also collaborated with such magazines as L'autre journal and La légende du siècle, has founded a new magazine specialising in Asian issues and collaborated with gastronomy, tourism and travel magazines.

She has refocused her activities on writing and regularly publishes her texts in literary reviews such as Alter texto, Hakaî, Poète, Carquois, les Cahiers de Poésie and Gong.

Karedas 
Belkhodja founded Karedas, a company dedicated to film production and publishing, and launched a kaiseki collection dedicated to haiku. To inaugurate this collection, she called on Yves Brillon, a Canadian haiku poet who won two awards in the 2005 and 2006 haiku competitions organised by Karedas and the Japanese Cultural Centre in Paris. Belkhodja is currently running a haiku writing workshop on the Psychologies magazine website, in which she has presented keys to haiku writing.

Marco Polo magazine international haiku competition 
This yearly competition set up in 2005 rewards the best haiku writers from ten countries.
18 May 2005: inaugural award ceremony at the House of Japan in Paris under the aegis of the Japanese Embassy in Paris.
25 November 2006: 2nd award ceremony at the Franco-Japanese Cultural Centre in Paris.
4 May 2007: 3rd award ceremony at the Tenri Centre, in the framework of the 9th edition of Printemps des Poètes whose theme was love.

Filmography

Feature films 
 1980: La chanson du mal aimé by Claude Weisz
 1981: Le Cadeau by Michel Lang
 1982: Pour cent briques, t'as plus rien by Édouard Molinaro
 1984: Une maille à l'endroit, une maille à l'envers by Madeleine Laïk
 1986: Nuit docile by Guy Gilles
 1986: Noir et blanc by Claire Devers
 1987: Cinématon No. 999 by Gérard Courant
 1988: L'Autre nuit by Jean Pierre Limousin
 1996: The Proprietor by Ismail Merchant
 1996: Level Five by Chris Marker
 1997: Silent Movie by Chris Marker
 1998: La Puce by Emmanuelle Bercot
 2001: Roberto Succo by Cédric Kahn

Short films 
 1976: L'Étourdie by Annie Bertini
 1980: Fragments du discours amoureux by Denis Lazerme
 1984: Le Compte-rendu by Benoît Peeters
 1985: Procès de l'oeuf by Catherine Belkhodja
 1989: Clip New Order by Chris Marker
 1990: Yoyo by Catherine Belkhodja – Music score: Gabriel Yared
 1991: Cinéma by Catherine Belkhodja – Music score: Gabriel Yared
 1991: Place des Vosges with Isild Le Besco and Kolia Litscher
 1993: Parfaitement imparfaite by and with Catherine Belkhodja

Television 
 1981: Point de rencontre by Michel Favart
 1983: Der Fahnder by Erwin Keusch (Bavaria)
 1985: Studio Lavabo by de Patrick Bouchitey (Canal +)
 1986: Double – Face by Serge Leroy
 1987: Marc et Sophie by Stéphane Barbier and Guy Gingembre
 1988: Les hommes de bonne volonté from the novel by Jules Romains
 1989: The Owl's Legacy by Chris Marker
 1990: Berliner balade by Chris Marker (voice)
 1987: Reflets perdus du miroir with Maïwenn Le Besco and Isild Le Besco

Theatre appearances 
 1980: Bernarda's House by Federico Garcia Lorca – Théâtre de La Villette – directed by Youssef Hamid
 1982: Pheadra – Théâtre de l'Atopie – directed by Norbet Heinbûrger
 1986: Le voleur d'autobus – Théâtre Yerma – directed by Youssef Hamid

Publications

Karedas 

L'ombre du caméléon by François Roche (Architecture, distributed by the Institut français d'architecture)
 by Nam & Sor (essay)
Peintures by Dominique Maraval (Art plastique collection)
D'un instant à l'autre by Yves Brillon (Haiku, Kaiseki collection)
Amas d'étoiles: collective work by award winners of MARCO POLO 2005 haiku competition (Haiku – Kaiseki collection)
L'heure du thé by Diane Descôteaux (Haiku, Kaiseki collection)

Personal works 
Nuits blanches aux roches noires, Karedas, Kaiseki collection, Paris, 2007.

Collective works 
Haïdjins francophones, Karedas, Kaiseki collection, Paris, December 2007
Amas d'étoiles, Karedas, February 2007, Paris
Regards de femmes, Editions Adage, Montréal 2008
Dix vues du haiku, AFH, Paris 2007
La rumeur du coffre à jouets, L'Iroli, Paris 2008

Literary reviews 
Forcer à quitter (tanka), Haikai, Canada, June 2006
Roches noires (juinku), Haikai, Canada, December 2006
L'araignée de fer, Carquois n°18, Canada, June 2006
Les félins attaquent les ombres (hankasen with Diane Descôteaux), Haikai, Canada, August 2006
Rêve d'octobre en juillet (kasen with Diane Descôteaux), Haikai, Canada, October 2006
Sic vitam hominum (kasen with Diane Descôteaux), Haikai, Canada, December 2006
Talon d'Achille (with Diane Descôteaux), Haikai, Canada, April 2007
Poumon cru (jusanbutsu with Pascale Baud), Haikai, Canada, October 2006
Mélodie en sous-sol (jusanbutsu with Pascale Baud), Haikai, Canada, December 2006
Haïkus allemands, traductions et commentaires, Gong n°12, July 2006
Petite leçon de haïku, Psychologies Magazine, Paris, January 2007
Self-bind mini-book (Conception), Marco Polo magazine n°12, Paris, November 2006
Écho d'Asie, haiku press review, Marco Polo magazine n°12, Paris, November 2006
Haïku : dans l'air du temps, Marco Polo magazine n°13, Paris, September 2007
Les cahiers de poésie 6, Luxemburg, 2006 – 
Les cahiers de poésie 7, Luxemburg, 2006 – 
Revue Alter texto, New Caledonia, April 2006

See also 
List of stage mothers

References

External links 
 
: her filmography on actricesdefrance.org
: her filmography on Unifrance French cinema promotion in English
: filmography on Movies. New York Times
: filmography on DVD toiles with photos
catherinebelkhodja.free.fr Catherine Belkhodja's personal website in French
Interview de Catherine Belkhodja: an interview by Michelle Levieux for L'Humanité
Marco Polo magazine

1955 births
Living people
Actresses from Paris
University of Paris alumni
French people of Algerian descent
20th-century French actresses
French stage actresses
French film actresses
French television actresses
French National Academy of Dramatic Arts alumni